Ectopsocidae is a family of Psocodea (formerly Psocoptera) (book lice or bark lice) belonging to the suborder Psocomorpha. The family includes fewer than 200 species, most of them in the genus Ectopsocus.

Distribution & Habitat
They are distributed worldwide, with the highest diversity in Asia. In the genera Ectopsocus and Ectopsocopsis, fourteen species are known from North America. Ectopsocids have been found to inhabit dead leaves on tree branches and leaf litter.

Description
Members of the family are characterized by their absence of an areola postica in their wings, like in the family Peripsocidae.
These are brown, small-sized bark lice (1.5-2.5 mm, both nymphs and adults) with or without markings on wings.

Distinctive features 
The following are the distinctive features of these family members:
Robust, small-bodied bark lice: 1.5-2.5 mm in length.
Forewings are short, broad, and held in horizontal position (rather than tent-like as in other psocids).
Forewing pterostigma is rectangular.
Forewing areola postica is absent.
Hindwing veins Rs and M are connected by crossvein.

References

Lienhard, C. & Smithers, C. N. 2002. Psocoptera (Insecta): World Catalogue and Bibliography. Instrumenta Biodiversitatis, vol. 5. Muséum d'histoire naturelle, Genève.

[Johnson, K. P. & E. L. Mockford. 2003. Molecular Systematics of Psocomorpha (Psocoptera). Systematic Entomology 28: 409-40.]
[Johnson, K. P., K. Yoshizawa, and V. S. Smith. 2004. Multiple origins of parasitism in lice. Proceedings of the Royal Society of London B 271:1771-1776.]
[Lienhard, C. and C. N Smithers. 2002. Psocoptera (Insecta) World Catalogue and Bibliography. Muséum d'Histoire Naturelle, Geneva, Switzerland.]
[Mockford, E. L. 1993. North American Psocoptera (Insecta). Gainesville, Florida: Sandhill Crane Press.]
[New, T.R. 2005. Psocids, Psocoptera (Booklice and barklice), 2nd edition: Handbooks for the Identification of British Insects. Vol. 1, Part 7. Royal Entomological Society, London, UK.]
[Smithers, C. N. 1996. Psocoptera. pp. 1–80, 363-372 (Index) in Wells A. (ed.) Zoological Catalogue of Australia. Vol. 26. Psocoptera, Phthiraptera, Thysanoptera. Melbourne: CSIRO Publishing, Australia.]
[Yoshizawa, K. 2002. Phylogeny and higher classification of suborder Psocomorpha (Insecta: Psocodea:'Psocoptera'). Zoological Journal of the Linnean Society 136: 371-400]

 
Psocoptera families